Amărăștii de Jos is a commune in Dolj County, Oltenia, Romania. It is composed of three villages: Amărăștii de Jos, Ocolna and Praporu.

References

Communes in Dolj County
Localities in Oltenia